The Harlem River Lift Bridge (also known as the Park Avenue Bridge) is a vertical lift bridge carrying the Metro-North Railroad's Hudson Line, Harlem Line, and New Haven Line across the Harlem River between the boroughs of Manhattan and the Bronx in New York City. The average weekday ridership on the lines is 265,000.

History

First bridge

The first bridge on this site was constructed by the New York and Harlem Railroad in 1841. It was composed of four -long box truss spans, three of which were fixed iron spans, while the remaining span was a wooden swing span. In the closed position, the bridge had a clearance of only seven feet above mean high water. Masonry piers supported the four box-truss spans. In 1867, the wooden drawbridge was replaced with an iron one that gave a clearance of 50 feet. By the 1880s, the bridge was crossed by more than 200 trains a day.

Second and third bridges

The 1867 bridge was soon made obsolete by heavy traffic and dredging of the Harlem River Ship Canal. In 1888, the United States Department of War began work on the Harlem River to allow for unrestricted shipping activity between the Hudson River and the East River and through the new Harlem River Ship Canal at 225th Street. In 1890, the New York and Northern Railway, a competitor of the New York Central which operated freight traffic to the Bronx shore which relied upon barges to ship its freight, complained to the Department of War about delays to its traffic due to the New York Central's low bridge.

The railroad opted to raise the bridge, which was the only four-track drawbridge in the country at the time. Alfred P. Boller worked with the railroad to create the new four-tracked swing bridge. However, due to political pressure, it had to raise the grade of its line north of 115th Street on a viaduct, raising the project's cost significantly. In 1892, a law was passed establishing the Board of Park Avenue Improvement, and under the terms of the law, New York City was to pay for half of the project, with the remainder paid for by the New York Central.

The new bridge was to be -long and was built for about $500,000 by the King Bridge Company. The Park Avenue Line's grade had to be raised to allow it to reach the higher bridge, and as a result, a new four-track steel viaduct was built between 132nd Street and 106th Street.

During the course of construction, trains were to run over a temporary wooden structure along with a temporary two-track wooden drawbridge. The cost of the entire project was to be $2 million. At the time, construction was expected to begin on September 1, 1893. The work was divided into four sections. The bridge's design was underway in 1894, and in February of that year, the project was expected to be completed in December 1895. Service continued to operate while the complex work proceeded through a procedure involving the installation of temporary wooden trestles, trusses, and the installation of columns.

On February 15, 1897, trains on the Harlem Division started running over the new drawbridge over the Harlem River and the elevated structure connecting to it. The Department of War ordered that the bridge cannot be opened during peak hours, between 7 and 10 a.m. and 4 and 7 p.m.

Current bridge
Between 1954 and 1956, the New York Central Railroad built a fourth rail bridge on this site, this time a vertical-lift bridge, to replace the 1897 bridge. The new bridge opened in 1956. It has  of clearance when closed and  when open. During the 1960s, the bridge came under the ownership of several different companies, including Penn Central Railroad. Metro-North operates it, referring to it as the Harlem River Lift Bridge.

References

External links 

Metro-North Railroad
Bridges completed in 1956
Vertical lift bridges in New York City
Bridges in the Bronx
Railroad bridges in New York City
New York Central Railroad bridges
New York, New Haven and Hartford Railroad bridges
Bridges in Manhattan
Bridges over the Harlem River
Steel bridges in the United States